Luisa Rõivas (née Värk, born 6 February 1987) is an Estonian singer.

Luisa Rõivas was a runner-up of on the first season of Estonian Pop Idol (Eesti otsib superstaari). She was also a runner-up on Tantsud tähtedega, Estonia's version of Dancing with the Stars. Her dancing partner was Martin Parmas.

Rõivas participated in the Estonian Eurovision national final Eurolaul 2008 with two songs:"It's Never Too Late" with Estonian band Traffic and "God Inside your Soul" with Margus Vaher. She participated again in the 2015 edition of the Eesti Laul, where she reached the final stage but ended up in last place. In 2016 she was chosen as a jury for the second semifinal of the Eesti Laul

Rõivas is married to Taavi Rõivas, former Prime Minister of Estonia.

Rõivas was born one day before fellow singer Kerli Kõiv, who was also born in Elva.

References

External links

1987 births
21st-century Estonian women singers
Eesti Laul contestants
Estonian pop singers
Estonian Reform Party politicians
Idols (franchise) participants
Living people
Members of the Riigikogu, 2023–2027
People from Elva, Estonia
Wives of national leaders